Île-Brion Ecological Reserve is an ecological reserve of Quebec, Canada. It was established on August 24, 1988.

References

External links
 Official website from Government of Québec

Protected areas of Gaspésie–Îles-de-la-Madeleine
Nature reserves in Quebec
Protected areas established in 1988
1988 establishments in Quebec